Ana Mercedes Campos (July 27, 1930 – July 31, 2013) was a Salvadoran athlete recognized for her role in the 7th Central American and Caribbean Games in Mexico in 1954.

Sports career 
On August 10, 1954, in the framework of the 7th Central American and Caribbean Games held in Mexico, Ana Mercedes Campos will become the first Salvadoran woman to obtain a gold medal in the javelin throw category, imposing a 38.82 meters mark.

In 1967, in recognition of her legacy as an athlete, the Sonsonate municipal stadium was named Ana Mercedes Campos Stadium.

On January 25, 2012, she was recognized by the Legislative Assembly of El Salvador as "Most Deserving Daughter of El Salvador", due to "her valuable contributions in the field of national sport".

Campos died on July 31, 2013, from cardiac arrest at the ISSS hospital in her native Sonsonate.

Awards 
 2012: "Most Deserving Daughter of El Salvador" Distinction, awarded by the Legislative Assembly of El Salvador.

References 

1930 births
2013 deaths
Salvadoran female athletes
People from Sonsonate Department
20th-century Salvadoran women